Damir Ksyainovich Tregulov (born 7 November 1998) is a Russian football player.

Club career
He was raised in the FC Torpedo Moscow academy, with which he won the Moscow Cup (scoring two goals in the final) and Russian Cup for the born-in-1998 team.

He made his debut in the Russian Professional Football League for FC Solyaris Moscow on 2 September 2016 in a game against FC Pskov-747 at the age of 17.

He won zone Center of the Russian Professional Football League with FC Torpedo Moscow in the 2018–19 season.

He made his Russian Football National League debut for FC Tekstilshchik Ivanovo on 28 July 2019 in a game against FC Tom Tomsk at the age of 20.

References

External links
 
 
 Profile by Russian Professional Football League

1998 births
Living people
Russian footballers
Association football forwards
Association football midfielders
FC Solyaris Moscow players
FC Torpedo Moscow players
FC Tekstilshchik Ivanovo players